Belle de Jour may refer to:

 Belle de Jour (novel), a 1928 novel by French writer Joseph Kessel
 Belle de Jour (film), 1967 film by Luis Buñuel, based upon the book
 Belle de Jour (writer), a pen name of Brooke Magnanti
 Belle de Jour (character), a character in the television series Secret Diary of a Call Girl, based on one of Magnanti's books
"Belle de Jour", a song on the album Grace for Drowning by Steven Wilson.

bg:Дневна красавица
es:Belle de jour
it:Bella di giorno
hu:A nap szépe
ja:昼顔 (映画)
pt:Belle de jour
ru:Дневная красавица
simple:Belle de Jour (writer)
sv:Belle de jour - dagfjärilen
tr:Gündüz Güzeli (film)